The men's 50 metre breaststroke at the 2007 World Aquatics Championships took place on 27 March (heats and semifinals) and on the evening of 28 March (final) at Rod Laver Arena in Melbourne, Australia. 136 swimmers were entered in the event, of which 127 swam.

Existing records at the start of the event were:
World record (WR): 27.18, Oleg Lisogor (Ukraine), 2 August 2002 in Berlin, Germany.
Championship record (CR): 27.46, James Gibson (Great Britain), Barcelona 2003 (22 July 2003)

Results

Finals

Semifinals

Heats

See also
 Swimming at the 2005 World Aquatics Championships – Men's 50 metre breaststroke
 Swimming at the 2009 World Aquatics Championships – Men's 50 metre breaststroke

References

Men's 50m Breast Heats results from the 2007 World Championships. Published by OmegaTiming.com (official timer of the '07 Worlds); retrieved 2009-07-11.
Men's 50m Breast Semifinals results from the 2007 World Championships. Published by OmegaTiming.com (official timer of the '07 Worlds); retrieved 2009-07-11.
Men's 50m Breast Final results from the 2007 World Championships. Published by OmegaTiming.com (official timer of the '07 Worlds); retrieved 2009-07-11.

Swimming at the 2007 World Aquatics Championships